Strümp is one of the eight districts of the city of Meerbusch, Germany.  Its name is believed to be based on the stream Strempe that runs through the town and has its spring nearby.

Geography 

Struemp is located in the Center of Meerbusch surrounded by all other districts.  Its entire municipal area is situated on a fluvial terrace of the Lower Rhine region and therefore very flat.  The so-called Strümper Berg rises barely higher than the surrounding area.

The village of Struemp consists of the town center (at Xantener Straße), two settlements (Schürkesfeld and  Rottfeld/Strümper Busch) and a few farms.

References

Sources 
 :de:Strümp

Villages in North Rhine-Westphalia
Former municipalities in North Rhine-Westphalia